The Student Scout and Guide Organisation (SSAGO) exists to support Scouts, Guides, and people who have never been members of a Scout or Guide Association, who are students at Colleges and Universities in the United Kingdom, and who are interested in the aims, objectives, and methods of The Scout Association and Girlguiding UK. Many universities have a Scout and Guide Club affiliated with the University Student Union, although it is optional for a club to be union affiliated to be part of SSAGO. Where a University or College has no club, students can join SSAGO as Individual or "Indie" members.

Most clubs run a number of weekend and evening events during the term and longer events during university holidays. Each term one club organises a weekend open to all Club and Indie members of SSAGO called a Rally, in addition to this, a more formal event known as a Ball also takes place once per year.

The oldest example of a Scout and Guide Club in the United Kingdom is the Oxford University Scout and Guide Group.

After leaving University many members of SSAGO choose to join the Scout and Guide Graduate Association (SAGGA).

History
Informal Scout and Guide Clubs existed as early as 1915 when the first generation of Scouts grew out of the Scouting age yet wanted to keep some sense of fraternity. Some early organisations at colleges were known as Baden-Powell Guilds and Saint George Guilds.   A world equivalent to this exists today in the International Scout and Guide Fellowship, or ISGF. Some of the first clubs were set up in university towns, such as Oxford, Cambridge, Manchester, and London. Inter-club activities were run intermittently until 1927. By 1920, Rover Scouts had been set up for people over 18 but many people were also part of Scout and Guide clubs. University clubs banded together to form an Inter-Varsity organisation while College-based clubs formed a similar setup. It was not until 1947 that inter-club meetings started again, and even then only for the Varsity clubs (those from universities, rather than colleges). Only two colleges (Loughborough and North Staffordshire) were admitted to Varsity. No other colleges were admitted, partially because of snobbery in the old red-brick establishments. The Federation of Scout and Guide Clubs in Training Colleges was set up in 1956 for colleges, and a year later it formed the Intercollegiate organisation. In 1967, the Intercollegiate and Inter-Varsity merged to form SSAGO due to the dwindling number of colleges as many became universities.

SSAGO was 40 in 2007, to celebrate this event a special emblem was designed and the Summer Rally was replaced with a Reunion Event held near Lincoln in July. Whilst this event was run as a Rally there were some noticeable differences; there were fireworks on Friday night, all members old, and new, and SAGGA (who themselves are celebrating their 50th Anniversary) were invited to attend along with visits from prestigious guests such as Liz Burnley the current Chief Guide.

United Kingdom Scout and Guide Clubs and Rovers Crews were responsible for establishing an international Student Scout and Guide event called the Witan, named after the Anglo-Saxon gathering of the wise called a Witan. The first two such events were organised by the Oxford University Scout and Guide Group at Gilwell Park in 1959 and 1961.[1][2]

Rally
Rally is a national camp, held once every term where SSAGO clubs around the UK meet up to socialize and participate in a weekend of activities. The size of a rally can vary from around 100 to over 250 people. The three rallies are held each year in February, June, and November and, as they are hosted by different clubs each time, they offer an opportunity for participants to visit new places. The host club for each rally is chosen at the previous year's national SSAGO AGM.

Each rally has a theme chosen by the host club, which is incorporated into the rally through the different activities on offer across the weekend. Often, this includes experiences such as walks or hikes, on-site activities, visits to nearby attractions, or simply an afternoon off with which to explore. In addition, rallies can also include a ceilidh and themed fancy-dress competition.[1]

 *Due to the impact of the COVID-19 pandemic, the summer 2020 rally (Survival Rally, organised by Plymouth SSAGO) had to be postponed,[1] and later canceled.[2] Build-A-Rally and Green Rally Yellow Rally were run as virtual events.

Ball
In addition to the three rallies, there is also an annual ball hosted every year by a chosen SSAGO club. The ball provides an alternative to the camping and outdoors often associated with Scouting and Guiding by offering a formal meal, dancing, and another chance to socialize with other SSAGO members.

Typically balls will be themed, with accommodation available nearby, varying from hotels to scout huts depending on the participants' budget. Balls offer a packed evening program, giving everyone a chance to make new friends, catch up with old ones and have a great night outside of the campsite. Often, the ball will include activities nearby to help participants make a weekend of the event.[1]

 *Due to the COVID-19 pandemic, City of Steel Ball was postponed from April 2020 to February 2021, with a virtual event being held on the original date, however due to the continued restrictions on social contact within the UK the physical event was ultimately cancelled.
Due to the COVID-19 pandemic, WomBall was postponed from April 2021 to September 2021, with a change from the traditional ball format to a "festival style" event with games and activities on a campsite for an afternoon.

Existing clubs
There are currently more than thirty universities with a SSAGO club. There are also at least ten that no longer exist. The Universities with a functioning SSAGO club are:
Aberystwyth Student Scout and Guide Organisation (MSAGM Aber SSAGO)
Bangor University Guides and Scouts (Bangor BUGS)
Bath University Guides and Scouts (Bath BUGS)
Birmingham Universities Scouts and Guides (BUSAG)
Also open to students from Aston University, Birmingham City University and University College Birmingham
Cambridge University Scout and Guide Club (CUSAGC)
(including Anglia Ruskin University)
Cardiff Student Scout and Guide Society (SSAGS)
Also open to students from Cardiff Metropolitan University and University of Wales
Derby University Guides and Scouts (DUGS)
Durham University Scout and Guide Group (DUSAGG)
Edge Hill SSAGO (EHUSSAGO)
Exeter SSAGO (SAGE)
Glasgow SSAGO (GLASSGO)
Gloucestershire University Guides and Scouts (GLUGS)
Huddersfield Student Scouts and Guides (HUDSAG)
Keele SSAGO
University of Exeter and Falmouth University - Kernow SSAGO (SSAGOK)
Lancaster SSAGO (LSSAGO)
Leeds University Union Scout and Guide Society (LUUSAG)
Leicester Students of Leicester Universities Guides & Scouts (SLUGS)
Lincoln University Guides and Scouts (LUGS)
Liverpool University SSAGO (LUSSAGO)
Loughborough Students Union Scout and Guide Club (SCOGUI) - The name comes from the words SCOut and GUIde rather than an acronym of the club's full name.
Manchester SSAGO (ManSSAGO)
Newcastle Universities Student Scout and Guide Group (NUSSAGG) - Membership is open to those studying at Newcastle University, Northumbria University and Newcastle College
Nottingham and Nottingham Trent SSAGO - Society of Nottingham Guides and Scouts (SNoGS)
Oxford - Oxford University Scout and Guide Group (OUSGG)
Plymouth University Guides and Scouts (PLUGS)
Portsmouth University Guides and Scouts (PUGS) 
Royal Holloway SSAGO (RHUL SSAGO)
Salford SSAGO (SALSAGO)
Scouts and Girl Guides York (SAGGY)
Sheffield (StinGS)
Southampton SSAGO
Swansea University Guides and Scouts (SUGS)
UEA SSAGO (EGGS)
University of Bristol Guides and Scouts (UOBGAS)
University of South Wales SSAGO (SSAGO USW)
Warwick Guides and Scouts (WUGS)

 In addition to the clubs listed above, there are independent, or "Indie" members, who are often either students who are at a university without a club or those who have recently graduated and left university.

References

External links

SSAGO
SAGGA
The Scout Association
Girlguiding UK
Witan Event

Scouting and Guiding in the United Kingdom